n-Track Studio by n-Track Software is a multitrack audio editing, digital audio workstation (DAW) program for Microsoft Windows, OS X, Android and iOS.

n-Track Studio's capabilities include unlimited audio and MIDI tracks, up to 192kHz 24-bit high-definition (HD DVD, Blu-ray, etc.) audio recording, extensive plug-in support, and DVD-Video surround mixing up to 7.1 channel. It has native support for 64-bit CPU architecture computer systems.

History 
The first version of n-Track was released sometime between 1995 and 1996. It was originally a simple dialog box with 4 volume sliders for each of the 4 supported tracks. At the time when version 1.0 was released, multitrack recording was still largely done on tape decks or professional digital workstations. Major music software of the time (such as Cubase or Cakewalk) still didn't have audio capabilities and were mostly MIDI only, while audio editors (e.g. Cool Edit and Sound Forge) were mainly concerned with off-line editing for sound design or broadcasting. Although, since the mid 90s, many other PC multitrack recording programs have emerged. n-Track is still quite popular, as it provides a cutting-edge DAW feature set for less than US$100.

In June 2010, n-Track Software released the first version of n-Track for OS X. In 2011, n-Track Software released n-Track Studio for iOS. In October 2013, n-Track Software released n-Track Studio for Android.

Version 8 was released in 2016. n-Track Studio 9.0 was released in 2018.

See also 
 Digital audio workstation

References

External links 
 n-Track Wiki
 n-Track website

Digital audio workstation software